is a former Japanese football player.

Playing career
Ikitsu was born in Fukuoka Prefecture on May 20, 1977. After graduating from high school, he joined his local club Avispa Fukuoka in 1996. Although he was an offensive midfielder, he did not play often. In July 1999, he moved to the newly promoted J2 League club, Sagan Tosu. He played often as a regular player. After one year without playing a game, he joined the Regional Leagues club New Wave Kitakyushu in 2001. He retired at the end of the 2001 season.

Club statistics

References

External links

1977 births
Living people
Association football people from Fukuoka Prefecture
Japanese footballers
J1 League players
J2 League players
Avispa Fukuoka players
Sagan Tosu players
Giravanz Kitakyushu players
Association football midfielders